Events from the year 1981 in France.

Incumbents
 President: Valéry Giscard d'Estaing (until 21 May), François Mitterrand (starting 21 May)
 Prime Minister: Raymond Barre (until 21 May), Pierre Mauroy (starting 21 May)

Events
24 April – French presidential election: A first-round runoff results between Valéry Giscard d'Estaing and François Mitterrand.
10 May – Presidential Election won by François Mitterrand.
21 May – François Mitterrand becomes the first socialist President of the French Fifth Republic.
14 June – Legislative Election held.
21 June – Legislative Election held.
September – Launch of the Renault 9, a small-four door family saloon with front-wheel drive which falls into the Renault range between the R14 and R18 model ranges. It will share a floorpan with a new hatchback model to replace the R14 from early 1983.
18 September – France abolishes capital punishment, four years after its final execution.
27 September – TGV high speed rail service between Paris and Lyon begins.
 December – The Renault 9 is voted European Car of the Year.
1 December – Inex-Adria Aviopromet Flight 1308 McDonnell Douglas MD-81 crashes into mountains in Corsica, killing 173 passengers and 7 crew.

Births

January to March
4 January – Jean-Baptiste Paternotte, soccer player.
5 January – Sébastien Duthier, soccer player.
8 January – Mathieu Jost, ice dancer.
14 January – Myriam Baverel, taekwondo practitioner and Olympic medallist.
17 January – Thierry Ascione, tennis player.
17 January – Christophe Riblon, cyclist.
19 January – Mathieu Maton, soccer player.
21 January – Florent Lacasse, athlete.
26 January – Edwin Ouon, soccer player.
1 February – David Martot, soccer player.
8 February – Bertrand Grospellier, pro gamer and poker player.
15 February – Nicolas Rostoucher, swimmer.
20 February – Nicolas Penneteau, soccer player.
22 February – Élodie Yung, actress
26 February – Jean-Pascal Mignot, soccer player.
28 February 
Nicolas Puydebois, soccer player.
Florent Serra, tennis player
8 March – Laurent Pichon, soccer player.
16 March – Julien Mazet, cyclist.
18 March – Maxime Grésèque, rugby league player.
20 March – Sylvain Monsoreau, soccer player.
21 March – Sébastien Chavanel, cyclist.

April to June
6 April – Sébastien Grégori, soccer player.
13 April – Hassan Ahamada, soccer player.
16 April – Olivier Sorin, soccer player.
23 April – Vincent Bernardet, soccer player.
26 April – Matthieu Delpierre, soccer player.
2 May – Sébastien Maillard, athlete.
3 May – Benoît Cheyrou, soccer player.
7 May – Vincent Clerc, international rugby union player.
9 May – Ludwig Briand, actor.
9 May – Florine De Leymarie, Alpine skier.
13 May – Jonathan Joseph-Augustin, soccer player.
15 May – Patrice Evra, international soccer player.
22 May – Laurent Mangel, cyclist.
25 May – Thibault Giresse, soccer player.
2 June – Nicolas Plestan, soccer player.
7 June – David Attoub, rugby union player.
13 June – Guy Demel, soccer player.
16 June – Sébastien Roudet, soccer player.
30 June – Geoffroy Lequatre, cyclist.

July to September
15 July – Alou Diarra, soccer player.
19 July – Grégory Vignal, soccer player.
20 July – Jérôme Blanchard, pair skater.
28 July – Mathieu Béda, soccer player.
28 July – Vincent Restencourt, figure skater.
30 July – Sébastien Vaugeois, soccer player.
31 July – Sophie Duarte, athlete.
4 August – Frédérick Bousquet, swimmer.
6 August – Lucie Décosse, judoka.
12 August – Djibril Cissé, soccer player.
14 August – Adamo Coulibaly, soccer player.
20 August – Bernard Mendy, soccer player.
24 August – Hervé Bugnet, soccer player.
30 August – Grégory Béranger, soccer player.
3 September – Gautier Capuçon, cellist.
4 September – Gilles Rondy, swimmer.
16 September – Aurélien Boche, soccer player.
28 September – Loïc Loval, soccer player.
29 September – Julien Cardy, soccer player.

October to December
2 October – Jean-Félix Dorothée, soccer player.
4 October – Lionel Mathis, soccer player.
9 October – Gaël Givet, soccer player.
12 October – Guillaume Boussès, rugby union player.
30 October – Yohan Hautcoeur, soccer player.
30 October – Nicolas Laharrague, rugby union player.
1 November – Laurent Fressinet, chess Grandmaster.
1 November – Léo Margarit, musician.
17 November – Julien Brugnaut, rugby union player.
4 December – Thomas Pinault, soccer player.
19 December – Moussa Dabo, soccer player.
20 December – Julien Benneteau, tennis player.
30 December – Cédric Carrasso, soccer player.

Full date unknown
La Fouine, rapper.

Deaths

January to June
12 January – Marcel Gobillot, cyclist and Olympic medallist (born 1900).
13 February – René Taupin, translator, critic and academic (born 1905).
20 February – Nicolas de Gunzburg, magazine editor (born 1904).
27 February – Pierre Deley, pioneering pilot (born 1893).
15 March – René Clair, filmmaker (born 1898).
21 March – Roger Blaizot, General (born 1891).
16 April – Count Renaud de la Frégeolière, author and first president of the Fédération Internationale de Bobsleigh et de Tobogganing (born 1886).
25 April – Paul Bontemps, athlete and Olympic medallist (born 1902).
30 April – François Bordes, scientist, geologist, and archaeologist (born 1919).
31 May – Michel Rougerie, motorcycle racer (born 1950).
13 June – Joseph de Goislard de Monsabert, General (born 1887).

July to December
11 July – Jean-Jérôme Adam, Roman Catholic Archbishop of Libreville (born 1904).
9 September – Jacques Lacan, psychoanalyst, psychiatrist, and doctor (born 1901).
13 October – Philippe Étancelin, motor racing driver (born 1896).
16 October – Édouard Depreux, journalist, essayist and politician (born 1898).
29 October – Georges Brassens, singer and songwriter (born 1921).
3 November – Jean Eustache, filmmaker (born 1938).
10 November – Abel Gance, film director, producer, writer, actor and editor (born 1889).
25 November – Romain Bellenger, cyclist (born 1894).
5 December – Maurice d'Hartoy, soldier, politician and writer (born 1892).
30 December – Job de Roincé, journalist and writer (born 1896).

Full date unknown
Colette de Jouvenel, daughter of writer Colette (born 1913).

References

Links

1980s in France